Pirenella microptera is a species of snail, a brackish-water gastropod mollusk in the family Potamididae.

Distribution
This species occurs in the Indo-West Pacific.

Description
The length of the shell varies between 10 mm and 40 mm.

Ecology
Pirenella microptera is a predominantly mangrove-associated species.

References

External links
  Kiener L.C. 1839-1842. Spécies général et iconographie des coquilles vivantes. Vol. 5. Famille des Canalifères. Première partie. Genres Cérite (Cerithium), Adanson, pp. 1-104, pl. 1-32 
  Reid D.G. & Ozawa T. (2016). The genus Pirenella Gray, 1847 (= Cerithideopsilla Thiele, 1929) (Gastropoda: Potamididae) in the Indo-West Pacific region and Mediterranean Sea. Zootaxa. 4076(1): 1–91

Potamididae
Gastropods described in 1841